Horo Records was an Italian jazz record label, operated by Aldo Sinesio.

Discography

HDP series
 HDP 1-2 Irio De Paula orchestra Casinha Branca
 HDP 3-4 Sam Rivers trio Black Africa 1
 HDP 5-6 Sam Rivers trio Black Africa 2
 HDP 7-8 Ran Blake solo piano Open City
 HDP 9-10 Max Roach quartet The Loadstar
 HDP 11-12 Michael Smith duo Elvira Madigan
 HDP 13-14 Archie Shepp trio The Tradition
 HDP 15-16 M.E.V.: Lacy / Teitelbaum / List / Berger sextet United Patchwork
 HDP 17-18 Lee Konitz / Martial Solal Duo Duplicity
 HDP 19-20 Sun Ra Arkestra Unity
 HDP 21-22 Karl Berger duo Changing the Time
 HDP 23-24 Sun Ra Quartet featuring John Gilmore Other Voices, Other Blues
 HDP 25-26 Sun Ra Quartet featuring John Gilmore New Steps
 HDP 27-28 Burton Greene solo piano It's All One
 HDP 29-30 Lester Bowie African Children
 HDP 31-32 Gil Evans Orchestra Parabola
 HDP 33-34 Gunter Hampel / Jeannie Lee duo Oasis
 HDP 35-36 Bennink / Mengelberg / Rutherford / Schiano quartet A European Proposal
 HDP 37-38 Garrett List/ Lancaster/ Shahid, Etc. quartet American Images
 HDP 39-40 Wheeler / Rudd / Potts /Evan / Parker / Rjewski / Honsiger / Lacy / Lytton, etc. orchestra Laboratorio della Quercia
 HDP 41-42 Joe Venuti & Joe Albany quintet Joe Venuti & Joe Albany

Complete HZ Series (12 single LPs)
 HZ 01: Archie Shepp – Mariamar
 HZ 02: Don Pullen – Five to Go
 HZ 03: George Adams / Don Pullen Quintet – Suite for Swingers
 HZ 04: Michael Smith –The Dualities of Man
 HZ 05: Steve Lacy – Threads
 HZ 06: Ran Blake – Crystal Trip
 HZ 07: Jean-François Jenny-Clark & Aldo Romano – Divieto di Santificazione
 HZ 08: Steve Lacy – The Catch
 HZ 09: David Murray– Sur-real Saxophone
 HZ 10: Archie Shepp – Body and Soul
 HZ 11: Steve Lacy – Eronel
 HZ 12: Roswell Rudd – The Definitive Roswell Rudd

Complete hll Series Jazz a Confronto (35 single LPs)
hll 101-1 Irio De Paula quartet
hll 101-2 Marcello Rosa group
hll 101-3 Gianni Basso quartet
hll 101-4 Frank Rosolino quartet
hll 101-5 Giancarlo Schiaffini sextet
hll 101-6 Giancarlo Barigozzi trio
hll 101-7 Martin Joseph trio
hll 101-8 M. Schiano / Giorgio Gaslini group
hll 101-9 Renato Sellani quartet
hll 101-10 Johnny Griffin quartet
hll 101-11 Franco Ambrosetti quartet
hll 101-12 Teddy Wilson solo piano
hll 101-13 Massimo Urbani trio
hll 101-14 Enrico Rava quartet
hll 101-15 Charlie Mariano quintet
hll 101-16 Sal Nistico quintet
hll 101-17 Various Artists various Jac's Anthology
hll 101-18 Slide Hampton & Dusko Goykovich big band
hll 101-19 Mal Waldron solo piano - Jazz a Confronto 19
hll 101-20 Kenny Clarke quintet
hll 101-21 Don Pullen quartet - Jazz a Confronto 21
hll 101-22 George Adams / Pullen / Richmond, etc. quartet
hll 101-23 Steve Grossman quartet
hll 101-24 Enrico Pieranunzi trio
hll 101-25 Dannie Richmond / Adams / Pullen, etc. group
hll 101-26 Stafford James quartet
hll 101-27 Archie Shepp - Jazz a Confronto 27
hll 101-28 The Paris Quartet
hll 101-29 Roy Haynes quintet
hll 101-30 Gerardo Iacoucci solo piano
hll 101-31 Roberto Della Grotta quartet
hll 101-32 Lee Konitz quartet
hll 101-33 L. Agudo & A. Vieira percussion
hll 101-34 Valdambrini & Piana octet
hll 101-35 Piero Umiliani

References

 
Jazz record labels
Italian record labels